St John the Divine is the Church of England parish church situated in the suburb of Horninglow, north west of Burton upon Trent, Staffordshire. It is part of the Diocese of Lichfield.

The church was built in 1866, designed by Edward Holmes.

The church was designed (...) in a Geometrical style and consists of a chancel with north vestry, a nave of five bays, north and south aisles, and an engaged southwest tower with spire. It is built of brick faced externally with cream Coxbench stone and rendered internally with plaster and dressings of Bath stone. The nave arcades have octagonal piers with heavy, crocketed capitals and arches of blue York and red Alton stone in bands, and the high and wide chancel arch rests on corbels with short, detached stone shafts. The east window depicting the life of St. John the Evangelist is by William Warrington of London. The vestry was extended northwards in 1911, (fn. 20) and in 1928 the east end of the south aisle was fitted out as a Lady chapel with a memorial window for Sarah Auden depicting St. Chad and St. Hilda with Celtic motifs. The font is at the west end. A peal of four steel bells was increased to six in 1875-6.

The churchyard contains the CWGC war graves of eleven service personnel of World War I and six of World War II.

The first vicar of the church was John Auden, who died 23 November 1876. He was the father of George Augustus Auden and the grandfather of W. H. Auden.

References

External links

 St John the Divine, Horninglow

Borough of East Staffordshire
Horninglow
Churches completed in 1866
19th-century Church of England church buildings
1866 establishments in England